The 2017 World RX of Great Britain was the fifth round of the fourth season of the FIA World Rallycross Championship. The event was held at Lydden Hill Race Circuit in Wootton, Kent and also played host to the fourth round of the 2017 FIA European Rallycross Championship. It also hosted the second round of the 2017 RX2 International Series, the support category of the World Rallycross Championship.

Timo Scheider was absent due to racing for BMW Motorsport in the 24 Hours Nürburgring. British touring car champion Andrew Jordan replaced Scheider at MJP Racing Team Austria. This was Jordan's third appearance at the World RX of Great Britain, having previously finished third in 2014 and seventh in 2015.

Supercar

Heats

Semi-finals
Semi-Final 1

Semi-Final 2

Final

RX2 International Series

Heats

Semi-finals
Semi-Final 1

Semi-Final 2

Final

Standings after the event

Supercar standings

RX2 standings

 Note: Only the top five positions are included.

References

External links

|- style="text-align:center"
|width="35%"|Previous race:2017 World RX of Belgium
|width="40%"|FIA World Rallycross Championship2017 season
|width="35%"|Next race:2017 World RX of Norway
|- style="text-align:center"
|width="35%"|Previous race:2016 World RX of Great Britain
|width="40%"|World RX of Great Britain
|width="35%"|Next race:2018 World RX of Great Britain
|- style="text-align:center"

Great Britain
World RX
World RX